Balkan (Balqan) is a rural locality (a village) in Abdrashitovsky Selsoviet, Alsheyevsky District, Bashkortostan, Russia. The population was 28 as of 2010. There is 1 street.

Geography 
Balkan is located 40 km southeast of Rayevsky (the district's administrative centre) by road. Nikolayevka is the nearest rural locality.

References 

Rural localities in Alsheyevsky District